Manuel E. "Way Kurat" Zamora (born November 16, 1950) is a Filipino politician. A former member of Lakas–CMD, he has been elected to three terms as a Member of the House of Representatives of the Philippines, representing the 1st District of Davao de Oro (formerly Compostela Valley). First elected in 2001, he was re-elected in 2004 and 2007, and again in 2019.

Zamora is an agriculturist and farmer by profession. He has attracted media attention for his colorful personality and for habits such as regularly commuting from home to work in Congress on a bicycle. His life story was once featured on the ABS-CBN dramatic series Maalaala Mo Kaya.

In the current 18th Congress, Zamora is the vice-chairman of the House Committee on Appropriations and member of the Committees on Accounts, Games and Amusements, and Overseas Workers Affairs.

Notes

References
 
 

Filipino farmers
People from Davao City
1950 births
Members of the House of Representatives of the Philippines from Davao de Oro
Living people
Lakas–CMD (1991) politicians